Luther Rashard Broughton, Jr. (born November 30, 1974) is a former American football tight end in the National Football League who played for the Carolina Panthers and the Philadelphia Eagles.

He graduated and played his high school football at Cainhoy High School in Huger, South Carolina.  He played college football at Furman University.

He was drafted by the Eagles in the fifth round (155th overall) of the 1997 NFL Draft.  The 6'2", 248 pound tight end, however, played for the Panthers in 1998.  That season, Broughton played in 16 games and had six receptions for 142 yards and a touchdown.  On September 5, 1999, Broughton was traded to the Eagles and played for the Eagles in 1999 and 2000.  In 1999, he played in 16 games and had 26 receptions for 295 yards and four touchdowns.  In 2000, he played in seven games and had 12 receptions for 104 yards.  In 2001, he signed as a free agent with the Panthers and played for them again, having two receptions for 22 yards in his 14 games played.  He was signed as a free agent with the Chicago Bears in 2002.  He was later released and signed with the Green Bay Packers in 2003.

American football tight ends
Carolina Panthers players
Philadelphia Eagles players
Chicago Bears players
Green Bay Packers players
Furman Paladins football players
Furman University alumni
1974 births
Living people
Sportspeople from Charleston, South Carolina